Sandy Point Airport  is an airstrip serving Sandy Point on Abaco Island in The Bahamas.

Facilities

References

External links
 
 

Airports in the Bahamas
Abaco Islands